The Expo 2014 Unity World Cup was the 1st edition of the Unity World Cup, a biennial international men's amateur football championship, organised by the John Paul II Foundation for Sport. The tournament was played between 5 December and 14 December 2014 in Goa, India.

Teams competing
Group A
 
 
 
 
Group B

Venues
The tournament was played at numerous venues across India, including Goa (which hosted the semi-finals and the final), Mumbai, Pune, Hyderabad and Bangalore.

Group stage
All times are local, UTC+5:30.

Group A

Group B

Knockout stage
If tied after regulation, extra time and, if necessary, penalty shoot-out would be used to decide the winner. All times are local, UTC+5:30.

Bracket

Semi-finals

Final

References

Expo Unity World Cup
Expo Unity World Cup
Sport in Goa